Bárbara Virginia Sánchez Rondón (born 3 October 1990) is a Venezuelan footballer and futsal player who plays for Universidad de Chile and Venezuela National Team.

Club career 
Sanchéz moved to Chile in 2017 looking for better employment opportunities. She joined Universidad de Chile in 2018.

Season 2021 
In 2021 Championship Final, Sanchéz scored a goal against Santiago Morning, and helped the team win the title. She also won the award of Most Valuable Player of the final game.

International career 
Sanchéz was first called to the Venezuela National Team in 2021. She debuted for Venezuela on 19 February 2022 against Latvia in 2022 Turkish Women's Cup, and scored a goal in the same match.

Sanchéz has been a member of Venezuela National Futsal Team. She played in the Futsal World Cup in 2010, 2011, and 2012.

International goals

References 

1990 births
Living people
Venezuela women's international footballers
Venezuelan women's footballers
Women's association footballers not categorized by position